Alban Préaubert (born 20 September 1985) is a French former competitive figure skater. He won six ISU Grand Prix medals and five French national bronze medals (2006, 2008–11).

Personal life 
Alban Préaubert was born on 20 September 1985 in Grenoble, France. His studies focused on economy and management. He graduated with an MBA from ESCP Europe in May 2010. He expressed interest in sports management. As of 2011, he works for an asset management company in Paris. He has a red belt in judo.

Skating career 
Préaubert began skating in 1991. He was immediately attracted to skating after his father brought him to an ice rink to improve his balance for skiing.

Early in his career, he trained with Elena Issatchenko, champion of the USSR in 1965 and 1966, at Charleville-Mezieres. He later moved to work with coach Annick Dumont. Préaubert won the French junior national title and a medal on the Junior Grand Prix circuit. He skated at both junior and senior events in 2004–05.

2005–06 season 
Préaubert had a successful season in his first full year as a senior, with a podium finish at the 2006 French nationals, a 6th place showing at his first Europeans, and an 8th place in his World Championships debut.

2006–07 season 
For the 2006–07 Grand Prix season, Préaubert was assigned to 2006 Skate America and the 2006 Trophée Eric Bompard; he won the bronze and silver medals, respectively, qualifying him for the Grand Prix Final, where he finished fourth. He again finished sixth at the European Championships, but dropped out of the top ten at Worlds.

2007–08 season 
In 2007–08, Préaubert was again assigned to Skate America and the Trophée Eric Bompard; a fifth-place finish at Skate America dropped him out of contention for the Grand Prix final. He was tenth at the European Championships and was forced to withdraw from Worlds due to a back injury.

2008–09 season 
Préaubert began the 2008–09 season by defeating his countryman Brian Joubert at the French Masters and winning his third Trophée Eric Bompard medal, a bronze. He also won the bronze at the Cup of Russia and was an alternate for the Grand Prix Final. He finished third at French Nationals and was selected to go to Europeans, where he finished in fifth place, but was only third among the French skaters. As a result, Préaubert was not chosen to compete at the World Championships.

2009–10 season 

In the 2009–10 season, Préaubert again medalled on the Grand Prix circuit, winning bronze at Skate Canada. He again finished third at French nationals. The French men were competing for only two spots at the Olympics, and Préaubert, along with runner-up Yannick Ponsero, were selected for the European Championships only. There, Préaubert came in 7th. In March 2010, he participated in a French federation test skate to determine the second entry for the World Championships; Brian Joubert was eventually chosen.

2010–11 season 
Préaubert finished fifth and sixth at his two Grand Prix assignments in 2010–11, and followed this with his fifth bronze medal at French nationals. It was his final competitive season.

Programs

Competitive highlights

GP: Grand Prix; JGP: Junior Grand Prix

References

External links 

 
 

French male single skaters
Sportspeople from Grenoble
Living people
1985 births
World Junior Figure Skating Championships medalists
Universiade medalists in figure skating
Universiade bronze medalists for France
Competitors at the 2005 Winter Universiade
Competitors at the 2009 Winter Universiade
French male judoka